Michał Brzozowski (born 26 March 1988 in Tychy) is a Polish footballer.

Career

Club
In August 2007, he was loaned to Rozwój Katowice on a one-year deal.
Brzozowski made his Ekstraklasa debut on 27.03.2010.

In February 2011, he was loaned to Odra Wodzisław.

References

External links
 

1988 births
Polish footballers
Ruch Chorzów players
Odra Wodzisław Śląski players
Living people
People from Tychy
Sportspeople from Silesian Voivodeship
Association football midfielders